Isognathus rimosa, the rimosus sphinx, is a moth of the family Sphingidae. The species was first described by Augustus Radcliffe Grote in 1865.

Distribution 
It is known from tropical climates from northern Brazil north through Central America, the West Indies and Mexico to southern Arizona.

Description 
The wingspan is 70–102 mm. The upperside of the female forewing is mostly gray brown on the front half and dark brown on the rear half while the upperside of male forewing is yellow gray or gray brown. Both sexes have wavy dark markings. The upperside of the hindwing of both sexes is yellow with an incomplete dark border on the outer margin.

Biology 
There are multiple generations per year in the tropics. In Arizona, adults have been recorded in August. They feed on flower nectar, including petunias.

The larvae have been recorded feeding on Plumeria rubra in Cuba and Plumeria alba, Plumeria obtusa and Plumeria rubra in Puerto Rico.

Subspecies
Isognathus rimosa rimosa (northern Brazil north through Central America, the West Indies and Mexico to southern Arizona)
Isognathus rimosa inclitus Edwards, 1887 (Mexico to Nicaragua)
Isognathus rimosa jamaicensis Rothschild & Jordan, 1915 (Jamaica)
Isognathus rimosa molitor Rothschild & Jordan, 1915 (Haiti)
Isognathus rimosa papayae (Boisduval, 1875) (French Guiana and from Venezuela to Brazil)
Isognathus rimosa wolcotti Clark, 1922 (Puerto Rico)

References

External links

Isognathus
Moths described in 1865